Impact Field is a baseball park in Rosemont, Illinois, US, which is part of the Chicago metropolitan area. It is the home of the Chicago Dogs, an independent league baseball team playing in the American Association of Independent Professional Baseball. It opened in 2018, and seats 6,300 people. The ballpark features a double-sided digital scoreboard, which is visible to more than 70 million cars that travel on Interstate 294 each year.

In 2013, Bradley Stephens, the mayor of Rosemont, proposed the area of Impact Field as a possible site for a new Chicago Cubs stadium. It is located near O'Hare International Airport, as well as Allstate Arena, the Donald E. Stephens Convention Center, and the Fashion Outlets of Chicago.

In September 2017, Impact Networking, a provider of business technology services, purchased the naming rights to the ballpark over 12 years for an undisclosed sum.

The Chicago Dogs played their first game at Impact Field on May 25, 2018. They lost to the visiting Kansas City T-Bones, 8–4, in front of a sell-out crowd of 6,317 people.

References

External links
Chicago Dogs

Baseball venues in Illinois
Chicago Dogs
Rosemont, Illinois
2018 establishments in Illinois
Sports venues completed in 2018